François-de-Paule Latapie (8 July 1739 – 30 December 1823) was a French botanist.

1739 births
1823 deaths
19th-century French botanists
18th-century French botanists